Bill Worrell is an American guitarist/multi-instrumentalist and singer-songwriter. His career has included touring 2013-2016 as lead guitarist and often playing keyboards and banjo for the classic rock group America.

Early life and education
Worrell was born in Pasadena, California. He attended Moorpark High School, Glendale Community College, and graduated with a bachelor's degree in Classical Guitar Performance from California State University, Northridge in 2008. In the fall of 2016, he began his MBA in Music Business, a joint program between Southern New Hampshire University and Berklee College of Music.

His father is guitarist/mixing engineer Jeff Worrell.

Career

Worrell joined the group “America” in 2009, as guitar tech, originally subbing for the existing tech, Pete Leonardo, for 4 months. However, Pete was unable to return, eventually leading Bill to retain the position full-time. He continued as guitar tech until 2011, during which time, he was asked to sub occasionally for lead guitarist Michael Woods. In 2011, he left the group to pursue his own music, but returned again in late 2013 to replace retiring Woods. Affectionately introduced as “Billy the Kid," Worrell continued touring with the band until 2016, when he launched into a solo career.

Bill's music is heavily guitar-oriented. While many songs include lyrics and have a radio-friendly appeal to them, several are instrumental in nature. His first EP, “Bill Worrell” is entirely instrumental recalling the influence of Joe Satriani, Steve Vai, and John Petrucci.

Worrell released his solo "Nashville Sessions" EP, produced by Fred Mollin and featuring original songs Worrell co-wrote with Molly Rocklind, in August 2016. This album featured session musicians Shannon Forrest on drums, Pat Coil on keys, Kerry Marx on rhythm guitars, and Larry Paxton on bass. Fred Mollin played additional keys and percussion instruments.

In early 2017, Bill released a collection of instrumentals recorded over the years, called “Time to Change”. This marked a return to instrumental guitar compositions, although tracks such as “Time to Change”, “Jaded”, and “Done” include vocals.

In April 2018, he released the single “Crashing Down”. Later that year, he released “I Wanna Fly [Single]” – a track from his “The Nashville Sessions EP” re-recorded with new players, a new key, and a slightly different arrangement.

References

1985 births
Living people
American rock guitarists
Lead guitarists
American male guitarists
Berklee College of Music alumni
Southern New Hampshire University alumni
21st-century American guitarists
21st-century American male musicians